The Libby, McNeill and Libby Fruit and Vegetable Cannery was a cannery operated in Sacramento, California by Libby, McNeill, and Libby. The building is now listed on the National Register of Historic Places.

Libby, McNeill and Libby built nine brick structures near the corner of Stockton Boulevard and 31st Street (now Alhambra Boulevard) in 1912. The undertaking was the grand sum of $1 million.

The building was strategically located to provide access to two separate railways and employed around 1,000 workers.

Corresponding with a decline in canned food sales in the US, Libby shut down operations in the early 1980s. A developer purchased the building soon after for $2.5 million and remodeled it into an office complex, some of which was used by state offices, departments of UC Davis Medical Center, and a fitness center. In 1991, it was valued at $30 million.

See also
 History of Sacramento Cannery Industry
 List of canneries

References

National Register of Historic Places in Sacramento, California
Industrial buildings completed in 1918
Buildings and structures in Sacramento, California